General elections were held in Italy on 6 April 1924 to elect the members of the Chamber of Deputies. They were held two years after the March on Rome, in which Benito Mussolini's National Fascist Party rose to power, and under the controversial Acerbo Law, which stated that the party with the largest share of the votes would automatically receive two-thirds of the seats in Parliament as long as they received over 25% of the vote.

Mussolini's National List (an alliance of Catholic, liberal, and conservative political parties) used intimidation tactics against voters, resulting in a landslide victory and a subsequent two-thirds majority. This was the country's last multi-party election until the 1946 Italian general election.

Background 

On 22 October 1922 Benito Mussolini, the leader of the National Fascist Party, attempted a coup d'état (titled by the Fascist propaganda as the March on Rome) in which around 30,000 Italian fascists took part. The quadrumvirs leading the Fascist party, General Emilio De Bono, Italo Balbo (one of the most famous ras), Michele Bianchi, and Cesare Maria de Vecchi, organized the march while Mussolini stayed behind for most of the march; Mussolini allowed pictures to be taken of him marching along with the Fascist marchers. Generals Gustavo Fara and Sante Ceccherini assisted to the preparations of the March of 18 October. Other organizers of the march included the Marquis Dino Perrone Compagni and Ulisse Igliori.

On 24 October Mussolini declared before 60,000 people at the Fascist Congress in Naples: "Our program is simple: we want to rule Italy." The Blackshirts occupied some strategic points of the country and began to move on the capital. On 26 October, former Prime Minister of Italy, Antonio Salandra, warned the incumbent Prime Minister Luigi Facta that Mussolini was demanding his resignation and that he was preparing to march on Rome. Facta did not believe Salandra and thought that Mussolini would govern quietly at his side. To meet the threat posed by the bands of Fascist troops now gathering outside Rome, Facta (who had resigned but continued to hold power) ordered a state of siege for Rome. Having had previous conversations with King Victor Emmanuel III about the repression of Fascist violence, he was sure the King would agree. Instead, the King refused to sign the military order. On 28 October, the King handed power to Mussolini, who was supported by the military, the business class, and political right.

While the march itself was composed of fewer than 30,000 men, the King feared a civil war as he did not consider strong enough previous government, and Fascism was no longer seen as a threat to the establishment. Mussolini was asked to form his cabinet on 29 October while some 25,000 Blackshirts were parading in Rome. Mussolini legally reached power in accordance with the Statuto Albertino, the Italian constitution. The March on Rome was not the conquest of power which Fascism later celebrated but rather the precipitating force behind a transfer of power within the framework of the constitution. This transition was made possible by the surrender of public authorities in the face of Fascist intimidation. Many business and financial leaders believed it would be possible to manipulate Mussolini, whose early speeches and policies emphasized free market and laissez-faire economics.

While Mussolini appointed an economic liberal minister to the ecnomy, this changed as the Great Depression affected Italy along with the rest of the world starting in 1929, and Mussolini responded to it by increasing the role of the state in the economy to avoid a banking crisis. Back in October 1922, even though the coup failed in giving power directly to the Fascist party, it nonetheless resulted in a parallel agreement between Mussolini and the King that made Mussolini the head of the Italian government. A few weeks after the election, Giacomo Matteotti, the leader of the Unitary Socialist Party, requested during his speech in front of the Parliament that the elections be annulled because of the irregularities. On June 10, Matteotti was assassinated by the Blackshirts and his murder provoked a momentary crisis in the Mussolini government. The opposition parties responded weakly or were generally unresponsive. Many of the socialists, liberals, and moderates boycotted Parliament in the Aventine Secession, hoping to force the King to dismiss Mussolini.

On 31 December 1924 Blackshirt leaders met with Mussolini and gave him an ultimatum—crush the opposition or they would do so without him. Fearing a revolt by his own militants, he decided to drop all trappings of democracy. On 3 January 1925, Mussolini made a truculent speech before the Chamber of Deputies in which he took responsibility for squadristi violence but did not mention the assassination of Matteotti. This speech usually is taken as the beginning of the Fascist dictatorship because it was followed by several laws restricting or canceling common democratic liberties, all rubber-stamped by a Fascist-controlled Parliament.

Electoral system 
This was the first and only multi-party general election held under the terms of the Acerbo Law. The Acerbo Law had been adopted by Parliament in November 1923 and stated that the party gaining the largest share of the votes—provided they had gained at least 25 percent of the votes—gained two-thirds of the seats in parliament. The remaining third was shared amongst the other parties through proportional representation.

Parliamentary parties and leaders

Results

By region

References

General elections in Italy
Italy
General
Italy